White Moon may refer to:

Tsagaan Sar
White Moon, episode of Marco Polo (TV series) 2014
"White Moon", song by Ben E. King from Love Is Gonna Get You (album)
"White Moon", song from Get Behind Me Satan